John Alford (fl. 16th century) was a lutenist in London. He published there in 1568 a translation of Adrian Le Roy's work on the lute under the title of A Briefe and Easye Instruction to learne the tableture, to conduct and dispose the hande unto the Lute. Englished by J. A., with a cut of the lute. A 1574 edition added additional music. The work was the dominant English lute tutorial until Thomas Robinson's The Schoole of Musicke (1603).

Work
 A Briefe and Easye Instruction to learne the tableture, to conduct and dispose the hande unto the Lute. Englished by J. A. (1568)

Notes

References
 

English lutenists
English writers about music
Musicians from London
English translators
Year of birth missing
Year of death missing